Malinta may refer to:

 Malinta, Ohio, a village in the United States
 Malinta Tunnel, an underground bunker on Corregidor Island in the Philippines 
 Malinta, a barangay in Valenzuela, Metro Manila in the Philippines